Vibidia is a genus of ladybird beetle belonging to the family Coccinellidae, subfamily Coccinellinae.

Species
 Vibidia duodecimguttata  (Poda, 1761) 
 Vibidia korschefskii  (Mader, 1930)

References

Coccinellidae
Coccinellidae genera
Beetles of Europe